Metabotropic glutamate receptor 8 is a protein that in humans is encoded by the GRM8 gene.

Function 

L-glutamate is the major excitatory neurotransmitter in the central nervous system and activates both ionotropic and metabotropic glutamate receptors.  Glutamatergic neurotransmission is involved in most aspects of normal brain function and can be perturbed in many neuropathologic conditions. The metabotropic glutamate receptors are a family of G protein-coupled receptors, that have been divided into 3 groups on the basis of sequence homology, putative signal transduction mechanisms, and pharmacologic properties.  Group I includes GRM1 and GRM5 and these receptors have been shown to activate phospholipase C.  Group II includes GRM2 and GRM3 while Group III includes GRM4, GRM6, GRM7 and GRM8.  Group II and III receptors are linked to the inhibition of the cyclic AMP cascade but differ in their agonist selectivities.  Alternative splice variants of GRM8 have been described but their full-length nature has not been determined.

Ligands 

 (S)-3,4-DCPG: agonist
 AZ12216052: positive allosteric modulator

See also 
 Metabotropic glutamate receptor

Model organisms 

Model organisms have been used in the study of GRM8 function. A conditional knockout mouse line called Grm8tm2a(KOMP)Wtsi was generated at the Wellcome Trust Sanger Institute. Male and female animals underwent a standardized phenotypic screen to determine the effects of deletion. Additional screens performed:  - In-depth immunological phenotyping

References

Further reading 

 
 
 
 
 
 
 

Metabotropic glutamate receptors